Weekends Look a Little Different These Days is the third studio album by American country music singer Brett Young. It was released on June 4, 2021 via Big Machine Label Group. The album has produced three singles, "Lady", "Not Yet" and "You Didn't", the first of which has reached number one on the Billboard Country Airplay chart. Young co-wrote all eight tracks on the album.

Background
Weekends Look a Little Different These Days is Young's third album released under the Big Machine label. The title is a reference to Young's life as a father to his daughter, Presley. Although most of the tracks are about his family, Young also included songs about his past experiences, as well as the experiences of his co-writers. One such track, "Dear Me", details a narrator speaking to his younger self, in the midst of heartbreak, and encouraging him to move on.

Young confirmed the album's track listing on April 23, 2021. Like his previous two albums, the album is produced by Dann Huff. "Lady", "Not Yet" and "You Didn't" have been issued as singles.

Critical reception
Pip Ellwood-Hughes of Entertainment Focus gave the album a generally positive review. Although he criticized the project for only containing eight songs, his review was favorable toward Young's "soulful" singing voice and the lyrical content of the title track and "Lady" in particular. An uncredited review published by Off the Record was also positive, with the reviewer noting themes of fatherhood and family in the lyrics, as well as a "groovier sound" on the second half of the album.

Track listing

Personnel
Adapted from liner notes.

Ben Caver – background vocals (all tracks)
Ross Copperman – programming (track 2)
Zach Crowell – electric guitar (track 1), programming (track 1)
David Dorn – B-3 organ (tracks 1, 8), keyboards (tracks 1, 3, 6, 8), synthesizer (tracks 3, 8)
Justin Ebach – acoustic guitar (tracks 3, 6), acoustic slide guitar (track 6), synthesizer (track 6), programming (track 3), background vocals (tracks 3, 6), gang vocals (track 7)
Paul Franklin – steel guitar (track 8)
Jesse Frasure – acoustic guitar (track 5), electric guitar (track 5), B-3 organ (track 5), programming (track 5)
Ashley Gorley – gang vocals (track 7)
Sara Haze – background vocals (track 8)
Dann Huff – acoustic guitar (tracks 2, 5), tenor acoustic guitar (track 4), bass guitar (track 7), electric guitar (all tracks), electric guitar solo (tracks 2, 5, 8), mandolin (tracks 4, 5, 7), B-3 organ (tracks 6, 7), keyboards (track 7), synthesizer (tracks 4, 6), synth bass (tracks 5, 7), programming (tracks 2, 3, 5, 7)
David Huff – programming (all tracks except 2)
Elliot Huff – drums (track 2)
Kirk "Jelly Roll" Johnson – harmonica (track 7)
Charlie Judge – B-3 organ (track 7), keyboards (tracks 4, 5), piano (track 2), strings (track 2), synthesizer (tracks 1, 2)
Rob McNelley – electric guitar (tracks 1, 3, 6, 8)
Justin Niebank – programming (all tracks)
Jon Nite – gang vocals (track 7)
Jimmy Robbins – acoustic guitar (track 7), electric guitar (tracks 4, 7), mandolin (track 7), programming (tracks 4, 7, 8), gang vocals (track 7)
Jimmie Lee Sloas – bass guitar (all tracks)
Aaron Sterling – drums (all tracks except 2), percussion (track 1)
Ilya Toshinsky – acoustic guitar (all tracks except 2), mandolin (track 3), ganjo (track 7)
Derek Wells – electric guitar (tracks 4, 5, 7), slide electric guitar solo (track 4)
Brett Young – lead vocals (all tracks), background vocals (track 4, 5), gang vocals (track 7)

Charts

References

2021 albums
Brett Young (singer) albums
Big Machine Records albums
Albums produced by Dann Huff